Arthur Evans (born 13 May 1933) is an English former professional footballer of the 1950s.  He played professionally for Bury, Stockport County and Gillingham and made a total of 16 appearances in the Football League.

References

1933 births
English footballers
Association football goalkeepers
English Football League players
Bury F.C. players
Gillingham F.C. players
Stockport County F.C. players
People from Urmston
Living people